Fuscoderma papuanum is a species of squamulose (scaley) lichen in the family Pannariaceae. Endemic to Papua New Guinea, it was formally described as a new species in 2002 by lichenologists Per Magnus Jørgensen and Harrie Sipman. Here, in the cool, moist habitat of a montane forest dominated by coniferous trees from the genera Phyllocladus and Podocarpus, it was found growing on a bank of the Iora Creek. It is similar to the type of genus Fuscoderma, F. applanatum, but is distinguished from that species by its smaller size, narrower, smooth lobes, and by the black rhizines on the thallus underside that, in young specimens, protrude out beyond the thallus.

References

Peltigerales
Lichen species
Lichens described in 2002
Lichens of New Guinea
Taxa named by Per Magnus Jørgensen
Taxa named by Harrie Sipman